Giles Corey ( August 1611 – September 19, 1692) was an English-born American farmer who was accused of witchcraft along with his wife Martha Corey during the Salem witch trials. After being arrested, Corey refused to enter a plea of guilty or not guilty. He was subjected to pressing in an effort to force him to plead—the only example of such a sanction in American history—and died after three days of this torture. Because Corey refused to enter a plea, his estate passed on to his sons instead of being seized by the local government.

Corey is believed to have died in the field adjacent to the prison that had held him, in what later became the Howard Street Cemetery in Salem, which opened in 1801. His exact grave location in the cemetery is unmarked and unknown. There is a memorial plaque to him in the nearby Charter Street Cemetery.

Pre-trial history
Giles Corey was born in Northampton, England. He was baptized in the church of the Holy Sepulchre on August 16, 1611. Giles was the son of Giles and Elizabeth Corey. His birth is recorded in the parish records. His name is quite often spelled "Corey", but the baptismal record is "Cory". It is not certain when he arrived in North America, but there is evidence he was living in Salem Town as early as 1640. He originally lived in Salem Town but later moved to nearby Salem Village (now Danvers) to work as a farmer. There are quite a few entries in the court documents as to his behavior, which was not completely good, but in those times any accusation was an offense against the state.

Giles Corey was a prosperous land-owning farmer in Salem and married three times. He is believed to have married his first wife, Margaret, in England. Margaret was the mother of his eldest four children: Martha, Margaret, Deliverance, and Elizabeth. His second wife was Mary Bright; they were married on April 11, 1664, when Corey was 53 years old, and she bore him a son named John.

In 1676, at the age of 65, Corey was brought to trial in Essex County, Massachusetts, for allegedly beating to death one of his indentured farm workers, Jacob Goodale (also spelled "Goodell" or "Goodall"), son of Robert and Catherine Goodale and brother to Isaac Goodale. According to witnesses, Corey had severely beaten Goodale with a stick after he was allegedly caught stealing apples from Corey's brother-in-law, and though Corey eventually sent him to receive medical attention ten days later, Goodale died shortly thereafter. Since corporal punishment was permitted against indentured servants, Corey was exempt from the charge of murder and instead was charged with using "unreasonable" force. Numerous witnesses and eyewitnesses testified against Corey, as well as the local coroner, and he was found guilty and fined.

Mary Bright died in 1684. Corey later married his third wife, Martha Rich. Martha was admitted to the church at Salem Village, where Giles had lived. At the time of the witch trials, Corey was 80 years old and living with Martha in the southwest corner of Salem Village, in what is now Peabody.

Arrest, examination, and refusal to plead
Martha Corey was arrested for witchcraft on March 19, 1692. Corey was so swept up by the trials that he initially believed the accusations against his wife, until he himself was arrested based on the same charge on April 18, along with Mary Warren, Abigail Hobbs, and Bridget Bishop. The following day, they were examined by the authorities, during which Abigail Hobbs accused Giles of being a wizard. Corey denied the accusations and refused to plead (guilty or not guilty), was sentenced to prison, and subsequently arraigned at the September sitting of the court.

The records of the Court of Oyer and Terminer on September 9, 1692, contain a deposition by one of the people who accused Giles of witchcraft in Mercy Lewis v. Giles Corey:

Again, in this court, Corey refused to plead.

Death by pressing
According to the law at the time, a person who refused to plead could not be tried. To avoid people cheating justice, the legal remedy for refusing to plead was "peine forte et dure". In this process, prisoners were stripped naked, and heavy boards were laid on their bodies. Then rocks or boulders were laid on the plank of wood. This was the process of being pressed:

... remanded to the prison from whence he came and put into a low dark chamber, and there be laid on his back on the bare floor, naked, unless when decency forbids; that there be placed upon his body as great a weight as he could bear, and more, that he hath no sustenance, save only on the first day, three morsels of the worst bread, and the second day three draughts of standing water, that should be alternately his daily diet till he died, or, till he answered.

As a result of his refusal to plead, on September 17, Corey was subjected to the procedure by Sheriff George Corwin, but he was steadfast in that refusal, nor did he cry out in pain as the rocks were placed on the boards. After two days, Corey was asked three times to enter a plea, but each time he replied, "More weight", and the sheriff complied. Occasionally, Corwin would even stand on the stones himself. Robert Calef, who was a witness along with other townsfolk, later said, "In the pressing, Giles Corey's tongue was pressed out of his mouth; the Sheriff, with his cane, forced it in again." There are several accounts of Corey's last words. The most commonly told one is that he repeated his request for "more weight", as this was how it was dramatized in The Crucible, but it may also have been "More rocks". Another telling notes it as, "Damn you. I curse you and Salem!"

Samuel Sewall's diary states, under date of Monday, September 19, 1692:

It was and remains unusual for people to refuse to plead, and extremely rare to find reports of people who have been able to endure this painful form of death in silence. Since Corey refused to plead, he died in full possession of his estate, which would otherwise have been forfeited to the government. It passed on to his two sons-in-law, in accordance to his will.

Aftermath 
Corey's wife Martha was hanged three days later on September 22, 1692. She had a son from a previous marriage named Thomas; he showed up as a petitioner for loss and damages resulting from his mother being executed illegally during the witch trials. He was awarded £50 on June 29, 1723.

The gruesome and public nature of Corey's death may have caused residents of Salem to rethink their support for the witch trials. Corey was absolved of the crime in 1712, although Martha was not.

Despite Corey's efforts to protect his estate by refusing to plead, George Corwin still attempted to extort money from Corey's heirs after the witch trials. In 1710, Corey's daughter Elizabeth and her husband John Moulton filed a lawsuit seeking damages from Corwin. Her statement to the court read, "After our father's death the sheriff threatened to seize our father's estate and for fear that of we complied with him and paid him eleven pound six shillings in money."

Legacy

Legends

According to a local legend, the apparition of Giles Corey appears and walks his graveyard each time a disaster is about to strike the city. Notably, he was said to have appeared the night before the Great Salem Fire of 1914. The position of Sheriff of Essex County was also said to have suffered from the "curse of Giles Corey", as the holders of that office, since George Corwin, had either died or resigned as a result of heart or blood ailments (Corwin died of a heart attack in 1696). The curse was said to have been broken when the sheriff's office was moved from Salem to Middleton in 1991.

Literature
Giles Corey is the subject of a Henry Wadsworth Longfellow play entitled Giles Corey of the Salem Farms and an 1893 play, Giles Corey, Yeoman, by Mary Eleanor Wilkins Freeman.

Corey is a character in Arthur Miller's play The Crucible (1953), in which he is portrayed as a hot-tempered but honorable man, giving evidence critical to the witch trials. His wife Martha was one of the 19 people hanged during the hysteria on Proctor's Ledge. In The Crucible, Giles feels guilty about the accusation of his wife because he had told a minister that Martha had been reading strange books, which was discouraged in that society. Corey also appears in Robert Ward's operatic treatment of the play, in which his role is assigned to a tenor. A movie of the same name was released in 1996, featuring Peter Vaughan as Corey.

Actor Kevin Tighe portrayed Giles Corey in the pilot episode of the WGN television series Salem, in which he is pressed to death in a more-or-less historically accurate manner.

References

Further reading
Upham, Charles (1980). Salem Witchcraft. New York: Frederick Ungar Publishing Co., 2 vv, v. 1 pp. 181–91, 205, v.2 pp. 38, 44, 52, 114, 121, 128, 334–43, 480, 483.

External links
 
 Giles Corey Pressed to Death, September 16, 1692 , The Salem Witchcraft Papers, University of Virginia

People of the Salem witch trials
People accused of witchcraft
1692 deaths
Prisoners who died in Massachusetts detention
1610s births
English torture victims
17th-century American people
Kingdom of England emigrants to Massachusetts Bay Colony
People from Northampton
People who died in police custody